Nosferatu is a 1922 silent German expressionist film by F. W. Murnau.

Nosferatu may also refer to:
 Nosferatu (word), a synonym for "vampire" first mentioned by Emily Gerard and popularized by Bram Stoker

Gaming 
 Nosferatu: The Wrath of Malachi, a 2003 horror PC game
 Nosferatu (video game), a 1994 Super Nintendo Entertainment System game by Seta Corporation
 Nosferatu, a monster included in the 2000 video game Resident Evil – Code: Veronica
CFA-44 Nosferatu, a fictional fighter in Ace Combat 6: Fires of Liberation
 Vampire: The Masquerade, a tabletop role-playing game in the World of Darkness fictional universe
 Nosferatu, a vampire-type monster for the Ravenloft setting of Advanced Dungeons & Dragon 2nd Edition

Music 
 Nosferatu (band), an English gothic rock band
 Nosferatu (Helstar album), a 1989 metal album by Helstar
 Nosferatu (Hugh Cornwell and Robert Williams album), 1979
 Nosferatu (Popol Vuh album), a 1978 soundtrack
 Nosferatu (John Zorn album), 2012
 Nosferatu (Art Zoyd album), 1989
Nosferatu, a 2005 album by Bloodbound
 "Nosferatu", a song by Blue Öyster Cult from Spectres

In print 
 Batman: Nosferatu, a comic book
 Nosferatu (comics), a 2010 graphic novel
 Nosferatu Zodd, a character from the anime and manga Berserk

Other uses 
 Nosferatu the Vampyre (original German title: Nosferatu: Phantom der Nacht), a 1979 horror film by Werner Herzog
 Nosferatu (fish), a genus of cichlid fishes
 Nosferatu (wrestler) (born 1979), Mexican luchador enmascarado, or masked professional wrestler
 Nosferatu, a seasonal beer from the Great Lakes Brewing Company

See also 
 NOS4A2 (pronounced Nosferatu), a 2013 novel by Joe Hill
NOS-4-A2, a robotic vampire from the Buzz Lightyear of Star Command animated series